Carow is a surname. Notable people with the surname include:

Berit Carow (born 1981), German rower
Bill Carow (1924–2011), American speed skater
Evelyn Carow (born 1931), German movie editor
Heiner Carow (1929–1997) was a German film director and screenwriter. 
Jochen Carow (born 1994), German footballer
Jorge W. Carow (1874–1936), American politician and lawyer
Leonard Carow (born 1994), German actor